Alpheidae is a family of caridean snapping shrimp, characterized by having asymmetrical claws, the larger of which is typically capable of producing a loud snapping sound. Other common names for animals in the group are pistol shrimp or alpheid shrimp.

The family is diverse and worldwide in distribution, consisting of about 1,119 species within 38 or more genera. The two most prominent genera are Alpheus and Synalpheus, with species numbering well over 250 and 100, respectively. Most snapping shrimp dig burrows and are common inhabitants of coral reefs, submerged seagrass flats, and oyster reefs. While most genera and species are found in tropical and temperate coastal and marine waters, Betaeus inhabits cold seas and Potamalpheops is found only in freshwater caves.

When in colonies, the snapping shrimp can interfere with sonar and underwater communication. The shrimp are considered a major source of sound in the ocean.

Description
It is distinctive for its disproportionately large claw, larger than half the shrimp's body. The claw can be on either arm of the body, and, unlike most shrimp claws, does not have typical pincers at the end. Rather, it has a pistol-like feature made of two parts. A joint allows the "hammer" part to move backward into a right-angled position. When released, it snaps into the other part of the claw, emitting an enormously powerful wave of bubbles capable of stunning larger fish and breaking small glass jars.

Ecology

Some pistol shrimp species share burrows with goby fish in a mutualistic symbiotic relationship. The burrow is built and tended by the pistol shrimp, and the goby provides protection by watching out for danger. When both are out of the burrow, the shrimp maintains contact with the goby using its antennae. The goby, having better vision, alerts the shrimp of danger using a characteristic tail movement, and then both retreat into the safety of the shared burrow. This association has been observed in species that inhabit coral reef habitats.

Eusocial behavior has been discovered in the genus Synalpheus. The species Synalpheus regalis lives inside sponges in colonies that can number over 300. All of them are the offspring of a single large female, the queen, and possibly a single male. The offspring are divided into workers who care for the young and predominantly male soldiers who protect the colony with their huge claws.

Pistol shrimp have the ability to reverse claws. When the snapping claw is lost, the missing limb will regenerate into a smaller claw and the original smaller appendage will grow into a new snapping claw. Laboratory research has shown that severing the nerve of the snapping claw induces the conversion of the smaller limb into a second snapping claw. The reversal of claw asymmetry in snapping shrimp is thought to be unique in nature.

The claw of the snapping shrimp is a dimorphic addition to the arsenal of the shrimp. The snapping shrimp species will retain the same mate after copulation, making them monogamous. Most females of the Alpheidae species are susceptible to mating. Young females become receptive to males either just before (premolt stage) or after the puberty molt, making them physiologically mature and morphologically able to carry the egg mass. Male presence during the molt is beneficial for the female, as searching for a male during her soft‐bodied receptive phase would put her at mortal risk. Mates have more success with partners having greater body mass. The larger shrimp are most successful. These animals practice mate guarding, leading to a decline in mate competition, as well as bonding of partners. The male and female will defend their shelter to protect both territory and young. Larva develop in three stages: The nauplius larvae, zoea, and post larval stages.

Snapping effect
 
The snapping shrimp competes with much larger animals such as the sperm whale and beluga whale for the title of loudest animal in the sea. The pressure is high enough to kill small fish. It corresponds to a peak pressure level of 218 decibels relative to one micropascal (dB re 1 μPa), equivalent to a zero to peak source level of 190 dB re 1 μPa m. Au and Banks measured peak to peak source levels between 185 and 190 dB re 1 μPa m, depending on the size of the claw. Similar values are reported by Ferguson and Cleary. The duration of the click is less than 1 millisecond.

The snap can also produce sonoluminescence from the collapsing cavitation bubble. As it collapses, the cavitation bubble emits a short flash of light with a broad spectrum. The light is of lower intensity than the light produced by typical sonoluminescence and is not visible to the naked eye. It is most likely a by-product of the shock wave with no biological significance. However, it was the first known instance of an animal producing light by this effect. It has subsequently been discovered that another group of crustaceans, the mantis shrimp, contains species whose club-like forelimbs can strike so quickly and with such force as to induce sonoluminescent cavitation bubbles upon impact.

The snapping is used for hunting (hence the alternative name "pistol shrimp"), as well as for communication. When hunting, the shrimp usually lies in an obscured spot, such as a burrow. The shrimp then extends its antennae outwards to determine if any fish are passing by. Once it feels movement, the shrimp inches out of its hiding place, pulls back its claw, and releases a "shot" which stuns the prey; the shrimp then pulls it to the burrow and feeds on it.

When in colonies, the snapping shrimp can interfere with sonar and underwater communication. The shrimp are a major source of noise in the ocean and can interfere with anti-submarine warfare.

Genera

More than 620 species are currently recognised in the family Alpheidae, distributed among 45 genera. The largest of these are Alpheus, with 283 species, and Synalpheus, with 146 species.

Acanthanas Anker, Poddoubtchenko & Jeng, 2006
Alpheopsis Coutière, 1896
Alpheus Fabricius, 1798
Amphibetaeus Coutière, 1896
Arete Stimpson, 1860
Aretopsis De Man, 1910
Athanas Leach, 1814
Athanopsis Coutière, 1897
Automate De Man, 1888
Bannereus Bruce, 1988
Batella Holthuis, 1955
Bermudacaris Anker & Iliffe, 2000
Betaeopsis Yaldwyn, 1971
Betaeus Dana, 1852
Bruceopsis Anker, 2010
Coronalpheus Wicksten, 1999
Coutieralpheus Anker & Felder, 2005
Deioneus Dworschak, Anker & Abed-Navandi, 2000
Fenneralpheus Felder & Manning, 1986
Harperalpheus Felder & Anker, 2007
Jengalpheops Anker & Dworschak, 2007
Leptalpheus Williams, 1965
Leptathanas De Grave & Anker, 2008
Leslibetaeus Anker, Poddoubtchenko & Wehrtmann, 2006
Metabetaeus Borradaile, 1899
Metalpheus Coutière, 1908
Mohocaris Holthuis, 1973
Nennalpheus Banner & Banner, 1981
Notalpheus G. Méndez & Wicksten, 1982
Orygmalpheus De Grave & Anker, 2000
Parabetaeus Coutière, 1896
Pomagnathus Chace, 1937
Potamalpheops Powell, 1979
Prionalpheus Banner & Banner, 1960
Pseudalpheopsis Anker, 2007
Pseudathanas Bruce, 1983
Pterocaris Heller, 1862
Racilius Paul’son, 1875
Richalpheus Anker & Jeng, 2006
Rugathanas Anker & Jeng, 2007
Salmoneus Holthuis, 1955
Stenalpheops Miya, 1997
Synalpheus Bate, 1888
Thuylamea Nguyên, 2001
Triacanthoneus Anker, 2010
Vexillipar Chace, 1988
Yagerocaris Kensley, 1988

References

External links
 How snapping shrimp snap, University of Twente
 Article on pistol shrimp going into physical details
 Radiolab episode: Bigger Than Bacon – the history and science of snapping shrimp

 
Taxa named by Constantine Samuel Rafinesque
Decapod families